The Witcher: Monster Slayer is a geolocation-based role-playing video game developed by Spokko, part of the CD Projekt group. The game was released for Android and iOS on July 21, 2021, and is a prequel to the main Witcher game series.

In late 2022, CD Projekt announced that the game will be shut down on June 30th, 2023, after determining that the game did not live up to business expectations.  The game will be no longer be available for download after January 31st and all in-app purchases will be disabled by then.  Some Spokko employees who worked on the game are expected to be laid off.

Gameplay 
In the game, players take on the role of a witcher. The game world is an image of the real world, which is supported by Google Maps. The player has to move around in the real world in order to move around in the witcher game world. The location is taken over by the location function of the  end device. On the game world, the player will find all kinds of monsters, herbs or orders. Depending on the topography as well as the time of day or night, players will encounter different objects.

Players can choose to engage any monster that is within the immediate area in a one-on-one fight.  As witchers, they have a sword, sign-casting and explosives at their disposal, all controlled with the touchscreen, to defeat the monster they choose to engage, and must leverage the monster's weaknesses (such as choosing either fast or strong sword strikes) to inflict more damage and build up a critical hit meter for a chance to pass a quick-time event to inflict such hit for extra damage, while being careful to parry enemy attacks with the sword.  Players also can craft oils and potions with portable crafting stations that require repair after overuse to gain advantages in combat, while bombs can be purchased, found or even crafted later on. In addition to individual battles, players can also meet characters, which then lead to small quests.

Reception 

The game received "mixed or average" reviews according to review aggregator Metacritic. The game reached over half a million downloads on the Play Store within three days of its release.  By the time the game's shutdown was announced, over 100 million in-game monsters had been slain.

References

External links 
 

2021 video games
Android (operating system) games
Free-to-play video games
iOS games
Location-based games
Pervasive games
Video games featuring protagonists of selectable gender
Proprietary cross-platform software
Vertically-oriented video games
Video games developed in Poland
Video game prequels
The Witcher (video game series)